Inspirational Journey was released on October 24, 2000, and is the thirteenth studio album from American country music artist Randy Travis. His first album of gospel music, it also marked his return to Warner Bros. Records (by way of Word Records). The album was originally recorded during Travis' tenure on Warner Bros. in the late 1990s, but was not released until 2000.

"Baptism" as duet with Kenny Chesney, was included on Chesney's 1999 album Everywhere We Go, but is featured on Inspirational Journey as a solo by Travis. The song charted at #75 on the Billboard country charts. "Doctor Jesus" was originally recorded by Ken Mellons on his 1995 album Where Forever Begins. Waylon Jennings and his wife Jessi Colter are featured on "The Carpenter."

Track listing
"Shallow Water" (Tom Kimmel) – 3:43
"Baptism" (Mickey Cates) – 4:11
"Which Way Will You Choose?" (Ron Block) – 2:41
"Doctor Jesus" (Tony Stampley, Justin Bolen) – 3:02
"Drive Another Nail" (Marty Raybon, Michael A. Curtis) – 3:29
"See Myself in You" (Tom Kimmel, Tom Prasada-Rao) – 3:54
"Feet on the Rock" (Troy Seals, Buck Moore) – 3:10
"Don't Ever Sell Your Saddle" (Kim Tribble, Bobby Whiteside) – 3:40
"The Carpenter" (Randy Travis, Ron Avis, Chip Taylor) – 3:17
featuring Waylon Jennings and Jessi Colter
"Walk with Me" (Travis, Les Bohan) – 2:58
"I Am Going" (Travis, Buck Moore) – 3:48
"Amazing Grace" (John Newton) – 3:25

Personnel

 Larry Byrom - acoustic guitar
 Kevin Carroll - background vocals
 Mark Casstevens - acoustic guitar
 Jessi Colter - vocals on "The Carpenter"
 Jim Cox - keyboards
 Jerry Douglas - dobro
 Thom Flora - background vocals
 Sonny Garrish - steel guitar
 Doyle Grisham - steel guitar
 Aubrey Haynie - fiddle
 David Hungate - bass guitar
 Waylon Jennings - vocals on "The Carpenter"
 Jason Lehning - omnichord
 Paul Leim - drums
 Chris Leuzinger - electric guitar
 Terry McMillan - harmonica, percussion
 Brent Mason - electric guitar
 Steve Nathan - piano
 Calvin Settles - background vocals
 Odessa Settles - background vocals
 Shirley Settles - background vocals
 Lisa Silver - background vocals
 Hank Singer - fiddle, mandolin
 Marty Stuart - mandolin
 Fred Tackett - acoustic guitar
 Randy Travis - lead vocals
 Robby Turner - steel guitar
 Cindy Richardson-Walker - background vocals
 Billy Joe Walker Jr. - electric guitar
 Glenn Worf - bass guitar

Charts

Weekly charts

Year-end charts

References

2000 albums
Curb Records albums
Randy Travis albums
Warner Records albums
Word Records albums
Albums produced by Kyle Lehning